Dzhambolat Ilyich Tedeyev born 23 August 1968) is a Russian-Ukrainian former wrestler, who competed in the 1996 Summer Olympics. He is the brother of Elbrus Tedeyev.

He came in first at the 1990 Soviet Union nationals. European Champion 1993 in Istanbul, Turkey (90 kg). Tedeyev was a head coach of Russian freestyle wrestling national team (2001–2011, 2017–2021). Tedeyev is the youngest Russian coach ever.

Championships and achievements
As wrestler:
1993 European Championships – 1st (90 kg.)
As coach:
UWW Russian national team world rankings – 1st (2001, 2005, 2006, 2007, 2009, 2010, 2011, 2018, 2019, 2021)

References

1968 births
Living people
People from Tskhinvali
Olympic wrestlers of Ukraine
Wrestlers at the 1996 Summer Olympics
Ukrainian male sport wrestlers
Russian male sport wrestlers
Ukrainian people of Ossetian descent
Russian people of Ossetian descent
Ossetian people
Honoured Coaches of Russia